(Cagliostro in Vienna) is an operetta in three acts by Johann Strauss II to a libretto by F. Zell and Richard Genée. It premiered on 27 February 1875 at the Theater an der Wien, featuring Marie Geistinger and Alexander Girardi.

Reception
The premiere was highly successful, in no small part due to the audience favourite Alexander Girardi (1850–1918) as Blasoni. Another notable performer at the premiere was Marie Geistinger (1836–1903) who had created the role of Rosalinde in Strauss's Die Fledermaus. However, weaknesses in the libretto and—by Strauss's standards—the pallid music, meant the work could not garner the level of long-term public support of the composer's other works. These shortcomings were corrected in a version with a revised libretto by Gustav Quedenfeldt and music by Karl Tutein (who included themes from the Kaiser-Walzer) which premiered on 8 May 1941 in Danzig (Gdańsk).

Roles

Notable arias
"" [Gypsy child, how shiny your hair]
"" [The rose will bloom when kissed by the sun]
"" (Cagliostro Waltz) [Could I but fly with you through life]

Adaptations

Johann Strauss used material from his operetta for the following works:
Cagliostro-Quadrille, Op. 369 (1875)
, Op. 370 (1875), waltz
, Op. 371 (Hail Austria) (1875), march
, Op. 372 (If You Please!) (1875), French polka
, Op. 373 (On the Hunt) (1875), quick polka
, Op. 374 (Light and Shadow) (1875) polka
Erich Wolfgang Korngold wrote an arrangement of the work, first performed on 13 April 1927 in Vienna.

References

External links 
  Plot summary

German-language operettas
1875 operas
Operas by Johann Strauss II
Operas set in Vienna
Operas
Cultural depictions of Alessandro Cagliostro